The 2022–23 Scottish Lowland Football League is the 10th season of the Lowland Football League, part of the fifth tier of the Scottish football pyramid system. Bonnyrigg Rose Athletic are the reigning champions, but are unable to defend their title following their promotion to Scottish League Two.

Teams

For the 2022–23 season, Broomhill will be known as Open Goal Broomhill in a partnership with football media and podcast group Open Goal.

From Lowland League
Promoted to League Two
Bonnyrigg Rose Athletic

Relegated to East of Scotland League
Vale of Leithen

To Lowland League
Heart of Midlothian B

Relegated from League Two
Cowdenbeath

Promoted from East of Scotland League
 Tranent Juniors

Stadia and locations

Notes

All grounds are equipped with floodlights.

League summary

League table

Results

Lowland League play-off
A three match round robin play-off will take place between the winners of the 2022–23 East of Scotland Football League, the 2022–23 South of Scotland Football League, and the 2022–23 West of Scotland Football League, subject to all three clubs meeting the required licensing criteria for promotion. If two clubs meet the criteria they will face each other home and away, if only one club meets the criteria they will be promoted without a play-off. However if no club meets the criteria there will be no promotion to the Lowland League.

References

External links

5
Lowland Football League seasons
SCO
Sco5